Waymans Ridge is a ridge in the U.S. state of West Virginia.

Waymans Ridge has the name of the Wayman family which settled there.

References

Landforms of Marshall County, West Virginia
Ridges of West Virginia